"Nigeria, We Hail Thee" is the former national anthem of Nigeria, used from independence in 1960 until 1978. Nigeria's present anthem, "Arise, O Compatriots," was adopted in 1978, replacing "Nigeria, We Hail Thee."

History
"Nigeria, We Hail Thee" was adopted as Nigeria's first national anthem on October 1, 1960. The anthem's lyrics were written by Lillian Jean Williams, a British expatriate who lived in Nigeria when it achieved independence. Frances Berda composed the music for "Nigeria, We Hail Thee."

The second national anthem, "Arise, O Compatriots," replaced "Nigeria, We Hail Thee" in 1978.

Lyrics
Nigeria we hail thee

Our own dear native land

Though tribes and tongue may differ

In brotherhood we stand

Nigerians all, are proud to serve

Our sovereign Motherland.

Our flag shall be a symbol

That truth and justice reign

In peace or battle honour'd,

And this we count as gain,

To hand on to our children

A banner without stain.

O God of all creation

Grant this our one request.

Help us to build a nation

Where no man is oppressed

And so with peace and plenty

Nigeria may be blessed.

Criticism
When "Nigeria, We Hail Thee" was first announced, the new national anthem faced criticism for a number of reasons. The Daily Service, a newspaper run by the Yoruba organisation Egbé Ọmọ Odùduwà, started a rebellious campaign against the national anthem, which led to a committee being established to collect signatures as a petition.

References

Historical national anthems
Nigerian songs
Songs about Nigeria
National symbols of Nigeria
African anthems